Antero Vipunen is a giant who appears in Finnish mythology and Kalevala folk poetry. He is buried underground and possesses very valuable spells and knowledge.

The god-hero Väinämöinen has a spell with three words or luotes missing. In order to obtain them, he goes to wake up the sleeping Vipunen by pushing sharp stakes into his grave and through his mouth and stomach. Väinämöinen hits Vipunen in the stomach so hard that he gives up the luotes to get rid of the stomach ache.

Other 
In 1938, the Finnish composer Uuno Klami wrote the symphonic poem Vipusessa käynti (In the Belly of Vipunen), for baritone, men's chorus, and orchestra. This piece, which musically depicts the Väinämöinen-Vipunen story described above, received its world premiere recording by the Finnish conductor Sakari Oramo and the Finnish Radio Symphony Orchestra on the Ondine label (ODE859-2, 1995); the vocalists are Petri Lindroos and the Polytech Choir.

Antero Vipunen also gave his name to a book edited by Yrjö Karilas, which contains various plays and games, and contains both general and specialised knowledge. (Antero Vipunen: arvoitusten ja ongelmien, leikkien ja pelien sekä eri harrastajien pikkujättiläinen WSOY, Porvoo 1950. The 1st edition).

References 

 Kalevala, the national epic of Finnish people.
 , Antero Vipunen
  (Karilas bio)

See also 
 Kalevala
 Mimir
 Ymir

Finnish mythology
Finnish legendary creatures
Giants